OFZ may refer to:

 Obstacle-free zone, the protected airspace around an airport runway
 OFZ (bond), Russian government bonds
 Owen Fracture Zone, a transform fault in the northwest Indian Ocean
يافزد نزل حلقه عن ببي بليتون